Vuzix is an American multinational technology company headquartered in Rochester, New York. Founded in 1997 by Paul Travers, Vuzix is a supplier of wearable display technology, virtual reality, and augmented reality. Vuzix manufactures and sells computer display devices and software.  Vuzix personal display devices  are used for mobile and immersive augmented reality applications, such as 3D gaming, manufacturing training, and military tactical equipment. On January 5, 2015, Intel acquired 30% of Vuzix's stock for $24.8 million.

The company has offices in New York, Japan, and the UK and is the current market leader for video eyewear. Forte was a pioneer during the mid-1990s developing immersive head mounted displays for virtual reality and video gaming applications.

History
Paul Travers founded Vuzix in 1997 in Rochester, NY, under the name Interactive Imaging Systems, purchasing the assets of the virtual reality company Forte Technologies. The company started with products for the military and U.S. Defense, but then developed consumer virtual reality systems. In 1997, the company was hired as a subcontractor to Raytheon, designing display electronics for a digital night vision weapon sight.

In 2000, the VFX1 Headgear was featured in a commemorative US Postal Service stamp collection celebrating the 1990s.  The VFX1 was replaced by a higher resolution system dubbed the VFX3D in mid 2000.

In 2001, Vuzix launched its first consumer electronics product, the iCOM personal internet browser.

In 2005, Vuzix provided a custom high resolution handheld display system that created the 3D imagery for  Hitachi's pavilion at the 2005 World's Fair in Aichi, Japan. The Hitachi Pavilion allowed users to interact with computer generated models and dioramas of endangered species in a  Mixed Reality ride.

In 2005, the company changed its name to Icuiti.  Later that year, Icuiti launched its first product designed specifically for consumers, the V920 Video Eyewear.

Also in 2005, Icuiti was awarded its first military R&D contract to develop a high resolution monocular display device for viewing tactical maps and video.  This development would lead to the Tac-Eye product line, which began rate production in 2009 and is currently used in many major military programs including the Battlefield Air Operations kit.

A re-branding in 2007 changed the company's name from Icuiti to  Vuzix.

In 2010, Vuzix introduced the first production model see-through augmented reality glasses the STAR 1200. It was released in August 2011 for $4999.

Vuzix is currently under contract with DARPA to design and build a next generation heads up display for military ground personnel.  The DARPA PCAS program is large R&D program with the goal of allowing the joint tactical air controller the ability to rapidly engage multiple, moving and simultaneous targets within his area of responsibility.

In January 2013, at CES, Vuzix Corporation demonstrated working models of its new M100 Smart Glasses, the official press event of CES. Rated as one of the five top gadgets expected at CES by CNBC and given the CES Innovations award, the Vuzix Smart Glasses M100, expected to ship in second half of 2013, will enable wearers to access data and content from an iOS or Android smart phone from the cloud and ‘hands free’. The m100 was officially released in December 2013 for $1000: double the original announced price.

In January 2015, Intel invested $25 million in the company, gaining 30% ownership of the company.

In August 2017, Vuzix and BlackBerry became partners to deliver smart glasses for the enterprise.

Innovations

Video Eyeware
Vuzix created the first video eyewear to support stereoscopic 3D for the PlayStation 3 and Xbox 360.

Augmented Reality Eyeware
Vuzix created the first commercially produced pass-through augmented reality headset, the Wrap 920AR.  The Wrap 920AR has two VGA video displays and two cameras that work together to provide the user a view of the world which blends real world inputs and computer generated data.
During the Consumer Electronic Show in 2011, Vuzix announced the Raptyr.  The Raptyr is a see-through augmented reality display prototype that will be the first consumer product of its kind when it reaches the market in 2011.
The STAR 1200 is the first see-through augmented reality display to be mass-produced and was scheduled to be released in August 2011.
The Vuzix Smart Glasses M100 are scheduled for commercial release in late 2013.  Vuzix describes the M100 as the world's first, commercially available, hands free display and cloud connected communications system. The Vuzix M100 contains a virtual display with integrated camera and powerful processing engine, running the Android OS . Users will be able to connect wirelessly to their smartphone (Android-based) or other compatible devices. The M100 is also powerful enough to connect directly to the Internet, run applications and games itself. When connected to a smartphone, users will be able to engage with existing and future applications such as texts, video, email, mapping, and audio. As a hands free accessory with integrated camera/display functionality, Vuzi smart glasses will let users answer the phone with a visual address book and enable applications from text messaging and email to visual navigation (via an integrated GPS and head tracker) along with more advanced features like video recording. The interactive head tracking and integrated HD camera, combined with applications on the M100 and a smartphone linked to the Cloud, empower smartphone based augmented reality applications.

See also
MyVu

References

External links

Companies formerly listed on the TSX Venture Exchange
Display technology
Mixed reality
Multimodal interaction
Virtual reality companies
Display devices
Video hardware
User interfaces
Companies listed on the Nasdaq
Companies based in New York (state)
Eyewear companies of the United States